The 1912–13 Seton Hall Pirates men's basketball team represented Seton Hall University during the 1912–13 college men's basketball season. The head coach was Frank Hill, coaching his second season with the Pirates.

Schedule

|-

References

Seton Hall Pirates men's basketball seasons
Seton Hall
Seton Hall
Seton Hall